The Tita Neire is a mountain of the Mont Blanc massif, located west of La Fouly in the canton of Valais.

References

External links
 Tita Neire on Hikr

Mountains of the Alps
Alpine three-thousanders
Mountains of Valais
Mountains of Switzerland